Colón Municipality may refer to:
 Colón, Putumayo, Colombia
 Colón Municipality, Querétaro, Mexico
 Colón Municipality, Zulia, Venezuela

Municipality name disambiguation pages